The SKNFA Premier League, known for sponsorship reasons as the SKNFA National Bank Premier League (previously SKNFA Digicel Super League), is the Saint Kitts top division, created in 1980 and organized by the St. Kitts and Nevis Football Association.

It currently has 10 participating clubs and the season lasts from September to May. At the Regular Stage, each club plays the others twice (home and away) and the top four teams qualify to Super Four stage. The qualified teams play each other once and the top two teams from Super Four play a 3-legged Championship Play-off to determine the season champion. The lowest placed team in Regular Stage is relegated to Saint Kitts and Nevis Division 1, from which another one is promoted.

Despite being a league competition in CONCACAF none of the Saint Kitts and Nevis teams played in the recent years in the CFU Club Championship nor CONCACAF Champions' Cup/CONCACAF Champions League. Their last appearance was in CONCACAF Champions' Cup 1994 represented by Newtown United.

Clubs for the 2021 season
Bath United (Bath)
Cayon Rockets (Cayon)
Conaree (Basseterre)
Dieppe Bay Eagles (Dieppe Bay Town)
Garden Hotspurs (Basseterre)
Newtown United (Basseterre)
Saddlers United (Basseterre)
St. Paul's United (St. Paul's)
St. Peters Strikers (St. Peters)
Trafalgar Southstars (Basseterre)
United Old Road Jets (Basseterre)
Village Superstars (Champsville)

Previous winners

1978 : Village Superstars
1979 : unknown
1980 : Village Superstars
1981 : Newtown United  
1982 : unknown
1983 : unknown
1984 : Newtown United  
1985 : unknown
1986 : Garden Hotspurs 
1987 : Newtown United  
1988 : Newtown United  
1989 : Newtown United  
1990 : Garden Hotspurs
1991 : Village Superstars
1992 : Newtown United  
1993 : Newtown United  
1994 : Garden Hotspurs
1995 : Newtown United  
1996 : Newtown United  
1997 : Newtown United  
1998 : Newtown United  
1999 : St. Paul's United
2000–01 : Garden Hotspurs
2001–02 : Cayon Rockets
2002–03 : Village Superstars
2003–04 : Newtown United 
2004–05 : Village Superstars  
2005–06 : Village Superstars
2006–07 : Newtown United
2007–08 : Newtown United
2008–09 : St. Paul's United
2009–10 : Newtown United
2010–11 : Village Superstars
2011–12 : Newtown United
2012–13 : Conaree
2013–14 : St. Paul's United
2014–15 : St. Paul's United
2015–16 : Cayon Rockets
2016–17 : Cayon Rockets
2017–18 : Village Superstars
2018–19 : abandoned
2019–20 : St. Paul's United
2020–21 : not held due to COVID-19
2021–22 : St. Paul's United

Performance by club

Top Scorers

References

Saint Kitts and Nevis - List of Champions, RSSSF.com

Football leagues in Saint Kitts and Nevis
Top level football leagues in the Caribbean
1980 establishments in Saint Kitts and Nevis
Sports leagues established in 1980